Ananias may refer to:

People

Mononyms
 Ananias ben Onias, general of Cleopatra III
 Ananias of Adiabene ( 15 BCE– 30 CE), Jewish merchant and mendicant proselytizer prominent at the court of Abinergaos I
 Ananias son of Nedebeus, first century CE high priest of the Jewish Sanhedrin, who presided during the trial of Paul at Jerusalem and Caesarea
 Ananias and Sapphira, members of the first Christian community, who were struck dead for lying to God
 Ananias of Damascus or St. Ananias II, missionary, martyr, and patron of St. Paul
 Ananias III, a saint in the 3rd century
 Ananias (Persian), priest and fellow martyr of Shemon Bar Sabbae (died 345)
 Ananias of Shirak or Anania Shirakatsi (610–685), Armenian mathematician and astronomer of 7th century
 Ananias I of Armenia (died 968)
 Ananias (Jafaridze) (born 1949), Metropolitan of Manglisi and the Tetri-Tskaro of the Georgian Orthodox Church
 Ananias (footballer) (1989–2016), Brazilian footballer

Surname
 Frans Ananias (born 1972), Namibian retired footballer

Given name
 Ananias Diokno (1860–1922), Leader of the Filipino Visayan forces against the US during the Philippine–American War; grandfather of Jose Diokno
 Ananias Dare ( 1560–1587), husband of Eleanor White and father of Virginia Dare, whose birth was the first to English parents in North America
 Ananias Davisson (1780–1857), American singing school teacher, printer and compiler of shape note tunebooks
 Ananías Maidana (1923–2010), teacher and politician in Paraguay

Other uses
 Ananias (gastropod), an extinct genus in family Eotomariidae

See also
 Prince Ananias, a 1894 operetta composed by Victor Herbert
 Tenente Ananias, a municipality in the state of Rio Grande do Norte in the Northeast region of Brazil
 Jesus ben Ananias, plebeian and husbandman who predicted the fall of Jerusalem c. 62 CE
 Anania (name)
 Hananiah (disambiguation)